Clypeostoma townsendianum is a species of sea snail, a marine gastropod mollusk in the family Chilodontidae.

Description
The height of the shell attains  2 mm.

Distribution
This species occurs in the Gulf of Oman and in the Indian Ocean off Réunion.

References

External links
 To World Register of Marine Species
 

townsendianum
Gastropods described in 1903